Randamoozham is a 1984 Indian Malayalam-language mythological drama novel written by the Indian author M. T. Vasudevan Nair, widely credited as his masterpiece. The work won the Vayalar Award, given for the best literary work in Malayalam, in 1985. It also won the Muttathu Varkey Award in 1994. The novel has been translated to multiple languages. It was translated into English as Second Turn by P. K. Ravindranath in 1997. Another English translation by Gita Krishnankutty published in 2013 is titled Bhima: Lone Warrior.

The novel is a retelling of the Indian epic Mahabharata from the perspective of Bhima, the second Pandava. The story deviates from the traditional Mahabharata story as it avoids the divine elements of the ancient epic and re-represent the characters and events realistically. One of the reasons critics cite for the novel's cult following is its revisionism, that was a first time in Malayalam literature. The book was translated to Tamil by Kurunjivelan as "Irandaam Idam" with cover illustration by Trotsky Marudu.

But the project has since been shelved.

Plot
The story begins with the incident of Mahaprasthanika Parva where the Pandavas leave for the pilgrimage to Himalayas forsaking all the worldly possessions. The story runs through the eyes of Bhima who faces seemingly severe frustrations as a young man. Always destined to be second to his weak elder brother Yudhishthira in seniority and younger brother Arjuna in fame and popularity, Bhima is not given his due as the main architect of the Pandava victory over their cousins Kauravas in the Kurukshetra war, despite killing all the 100 Kauravas. The book unravels all the hardship and dilemmas encountered by Bhima which remain unnoticed. The book explores the emotions of the mighty Pandava as a son, brother, husband and father. The book brings to light the affection that he holds for his wife draupadi and how unnoticed his acts of love remains. The story questions the mourning of Arjuna's son, Abhimanyu when he is killed during the battle while trying to break the Chakravyuh formation, while Bhima's son, Ghatokkach is led to his death by sacrificing his life to save Arjuna's life and his sacrifice too remains unsung and everyone enjoys the happiness of saving Arjuna's life. Towards the end of the book he is shown as the only husband who stops and tries to stay with Draupadi in her last moments during their pilgrimage.

Film adaptation
In 2011, director Hariharan announced his plan to adapt Randamoozham to screen, scripted by M. T. Vasudevan Nair himself with Mohanlal cast to play Bhima. Later, V. A. Shrikumar Menon took the project again with Mohanlal in the lead, it was announced in April 2017 that the film adaptation will be produced by B. R. Shetty. With its  budget, the film is expected to be the most expensive film in Indian cinema, and one of the most expensive non-English language film. The film will be shot in two parts. Plans for the movie has since been shelved after M. T. Vasudevan Nair was upset with the pace at which the film was progressing and demanding Srikumar Menon to return the script.

References

External links
 Randamoozham on DC Books

Malayalam novels
Novels based on the Mahabharata
Indian novels adapted into films
Novels set in India
Novels by M. T. Vasudevan Nair
1984 Indian novels